Many More Roads is Ky-Mani Marley's third studio album, released on May 29, 2001. The album was nominated for the 2002 Grammy Awards for the Best Reggae Album, but lost to his brother Damian Marley's album Halfway Tree.

Track listing
 "Who We Are"
 "Many More Roads"
 "Heart Of A Lion"
 "Yesterday"
 "Freedom"
 "Love In The Morning"
 "Ska-Ba-Dar"
 "Valley Of Decision"
 "Giving I A Fight"
 "In A De Dance"
 "Warning"
 "Hailie I"

External links 
 Official website of Ky-Mani Marley

Ky-Mani Marley albums
2001 albums